The Afghanistan cricket team toured Scotland in July 2016 to play two One Day Internationals (ODIs) matches at The Grange, Edinburgh. Afghanistan won the series 1–0, with the first match being washed out.

Squads

Nasir Jamal, Imran Janat and Afsar Zazai were named as reserve players for Afghanistan.

ODI series

1st ODI

2nd ODI

References

External links
 Series home at ESPN Cricinfo

2016 in Afghan cricket
2016 in Scottish cricket
Afghan cricket tours of Scotland
International cricket competitions in 2016
Afghanistan 2016